Cecil Antonio Brockman (born September 18, 1984) is an American politician from North Carolina. He was first elected to the North Carolina House of Representatives in 2014. A member of the Democratic party, he has represented the 60th district (including constituents in southwestern Guilford County, including all of Jamestown and Pleasant Garden and portions of Greensboro and High Point) since 2015.

Personal life
Brockman is a native of High Point, North Carolina. He earned a degree in political science from UNC-Charlotte. Before running for office, he worked on several North Carolina political campaigns. He is openly bisexual. He is one of four openly LGBT members of the North Carolina General Assembly, alongside Reps. Deb Butler (D–Wilmington), Allison Dahle (D—Raleigh), and Marcia Morey (D–Durham).

Committee assignments

2021-2022 session
Appropriations
Appropriations - Education
Education - K-12 (Vice Chair)
Election Law and Campaign Finance Reform
Energy and Public Utilities
Health
Redistricting

2019-2020 session
Appropriations
Appropriations - Education
Education - K-12 (Vice Chair)
Election Law and Campaign Finance Reform
Energy and Public Utilities
Health
Redistricting

2017-2018 session
Appropriations
Appropriations - Education
Appropriations - Capital
Education - K-12 (Vice Chair)
Agriculture
Environment
Homeland Security, Military, and Veterans Affairs

2015-2016 session
Appropriations
Appropriations - Education
Appropriations - Capital
Agriculture
Environment
Commerce and Job Development
Transportation

Electoral history

2020
Brockman was uncontested in the 2020 Democratic primary. He faced Frank Ragsdale in the general election and won with 64 percent of the vote.

2018
In 2018, Brockman defeated Kurt Collins with 69 percent of the vote.

2016
Brockman ran unopposed in the 2016 election for his district and was reelected.

2014
Brockman was first elected to represent the 60th district in the North Carolina House in 2014.

References

External links

Living people
1984 births
People from High Point, North Carolina
University of North Carolina at Charlotte alumni
Democratic Party members of the North Carolina House of Representatives
20th-century African-American people
21st-century American politicians
21st-century African-American politicians
21st-century American LGBT people
African-American state legislators in North Carolina
LGBT African Americans
LGBT state legislators in North Carolina
Bisexual men
Bisexual politicians